"All We Have Is Love" is a song recorded by American singer Sabrina Carpenter from her second studio album Evolution (2016), served as the last track of the album. The track was written by Carpenter, Afshin Salmani and Josh Cumbee, and it was produced by Nonfiction a collaboration of Afsheen and Josh Cumbee. The song was released by Hollywood Records as the first promotional single from Evolution on September 23, 2016 with the album's pre-order,  three weeks before the album's release. "All We Have Is Love" is a dance track. that talks about happiness, optimism and love that reflects in a new relationship. According to Carpenter, the song is the most positive song on the album.

Background and recording
In a French Fry Party on the Evolution Tour in Toronto Sabrina said that they started writing the song on the piano and Carpenter explained that firstly the song was called "All I Have Is Love" and it was a dark, saucy song that talked about "the life that you deserve". In the next day, they rewrote the song and they titled "All We Have Is Love" because they thought it would fit better into Carpenter's repertoire and album. Carpenter said in a track commentary that they start creating the song by building a fantasy world where happiness and love take place before everything. In that song commentary, Carpenter states “In the end, the thing that we need to cherish the most is love. And it’s not just love for your significant other…it’s just loving everything you can possibly love with your whole heart.”

In addition of featuring in the background vocals with Sabrina Carpenter, the duo Nonfiction (Afsheen and Josh Cumbee) wrote, produced, engineered and mixed the track. Chris Gehringer did the audio mastering at Sterling Sound in New York. The vocals were recorded in 2015 at Kite Music Productions at Los Angeles in California.

Critical reception
Brittany Goldfield Rodrigues of Andpop said "The first single dropped in promotion of the album, anyone who pre-ordered the record got ‘All We Have Is Love.” The tune manages to be a sweet love song, while being a fun dance track at the same time. Her soft vocals are perfect on the track, complementing the beats instead of overpowering them. Sabrina’s higher register is everything.".

Credits and personnel 
Recording and management
 Recorded at Kite Music Productions (Los Angeles, California)
 Mastered at Sterling Sound (New York City)
 Seven Summits Music (BMI) obo itself and Pink Mic Music (BMI)/BMG Platinum Songs/Soundish (BMI), All Rights Administered by BMG Rights Management (US), LLC. Used By Permission. All Rights Reserved./BMG Gold Songs/Cumbee Publishing/Kite Kid Music (ASCAP), All Rights Administered by BMG Rights Management (US), LLC. Used By Permission. All Rights Reserved.

Personnel

 Sabrina Carpenter – vocals, songwriting, background vocals
 Afshin Salmani – songwriting, production, background vocals, engineering, mixing
 Josh Cumbee – songwriting, production, background vocals, engineering, mixing
 Chris Gehringer – mastering

Credits adapted from Evolution liner notes.

Release history

References

2016 songs
Sabrina Carpenter songs
Songs written by Josh Cumbee
Songs written by Sabrina Carpenter